Underwater swimming can refer to:
 Unequipped swimming beneath the water surface, such as the streamline style
 Scuba diving, snorkeling, or free-diving
 Swimming at the 1900 Summer Olympics - Men's underwater swimming